Matthias Russ (born November 14, 1983 in Reutlingen) is a German professional road bicycle racer, currently unattached following the collapse of .

Palmares 

 Regio-Tour – 1 stage & Best Young Rider (2006)
 3rd, National U23 Road Race Championship (2003)

External links 
Personal website 
Profile at Gerolsteiner official website

1983 births
Living people
People from Reutlingen
Sportspeople from Tübingen (region)
German male cyclists
Cyclists from Baden-Württemberg
21st-century German people